Half Marriage is a 1929 American melodramatic pre-Code film directed by William J. Cohen from a script by Jane Murfin, based on the short story of the same name by George Kibbe Turner.  The film starred Olive Borden and Morgan Farley, while the later-famed gossip columnist, Hedda Hopper played Borden's mother.

Plot
Judy Page is a young society girl who falls in love with an architect who works in her father's architectural firm, Dick Carroll.  She lives in Greenwich Village in New York City, and one night after a party at her apartment, she runs off with Dick to get married.  They are intercepted by Judy's mother at the apartment, who, not realizing they have already been married, insists that Judy return with her to their estate in the country. Dick remains behind in Judy's apartment.

In the country, Judy is being courted by Tom Stribbling, who has insinuated himself to be close to Judy, at the expense of all other suitors.  Dick learns that Judy's parents are going to be away, and visits Judy at her parents' estate.  He has words with Stribbling, after which he makes plans to meet with Judy in the coming days at her apartment.  When Tom learns of the meeting, he sends a telegram to Dick, forging that it is from Judy, cancelling the rendezvous.  At the appointed time of the meeting, Stribbling shows up, instead of Dick.  When Judy makes it clear she wants nothing to do with him, Stribbling attempts to force himself on her.  In the ensuing struggle, Stribbling trips, falling out of Judy's window to his death.

Just as Stribbling trips, Dick has arrived at the apartment, to witness his fall.  Afraid that Judy will be blamed for Stribbling's death, Dick takes the blame, but the truth comes out during the brief police investigation, and Judy is cleared of any wrongdoing.  Also during the investigation it is revealed that Judy and Dick are already married, much to the astonishment of her parents.  After their initial shock, they give their blessing to the couple.

Cast

Songs
"After the Clouds Roll By" - Sidney Clare and Oscar Levant — performed by Ann Greenway
"You're Marvelous" - Written by Sidney Clare and Oscar Levant Performed by Gus Arnheim and His Ambassadors, with Ken Murray

Notes
The film was also released in the US in a silent version (at 5883 feet) by Radio-Keith-Orpheum Corporation [RKO] in 1929.

References

External links

RKO Pictures films
Melodrama films
Films based on short fiction
American black-and-white films
Films with screenplays by Jane Murfin
1929 romantic drama films
American romantic drama films
1929 films
Films directed by William J. Cowen
1920s American films